The National Production Authority (NPA) was an agency of the United States government which developed and promoted the production and supply of materials and facilities necessary for defense mobilization. It was part of the Department of Commerce.

The agency was created by Department Order 123, issued September 11, 1950, under authority of the Defense Production Act of 1950 and Executive Order 10161 (issued September 9, 1950). The organization's function was to ensure the needs of the civilian economy were adequately represented in defense mobilization efforts, and that small businesses were participating in defense contracts.

In 1951, after the escalation of the Korean War, the NPA was placed under the control of the Defense Production Administration in the Office of Defense Mobilization.  

The NPA was abolished by Department Order 152, issued October 1, 1953. Its functions were dispersed among a number of successor agencies, including the Business and Defense Services Administration (1953–1970); the Bureau of Domestic Commerce (1970–1972); the Domestic and International Business Administration (1972–1977); the Industry and Trade Administration (1977–1980); and the International Trade Administration (1980–present).

References
"New Machine." Time. January 15, 1951
Pierpaoli Jr., Paul G. Truman and Korea: The Political Culture of the Early Cold War. Columbia, Mo.: University of Missouri Press, 1999.

External links
Records of the National Production Authority. Record Group 277. 1941-53 (bulk 1950-53). National Archives and Records Administration.
Papers of Edward K. Moss (Director of Public Information for the National Production Authority), Dwight D. Eisenhower Presidential Library 

Defunct agencies of the United States government
Korean War
Military logistics of the United States
United States Department of Commerce
Government agencies established in 1950
Government agencies disestablished in 1953
1950 establishments in the United States
1953 disestablishments in the United States